Yang Mingxia (born January 13, 1990, in Danfeng County, Shangluo, Shaanxi) is a female Chinese race walker.  She represented her country at the  race walk event at the 2008 Summer Olympics, but was disqualified. She previously finished fourth in an IAAF Race Walking Challenge meet in 2008.

Achievements

References

Team China 2008

Athletes (track and field) at the 2008 Summer Olympics
Chinese female racewalkers
Olympic athletes of China
Universiade medalists in athletics (track and field)
People from Shangluo
Athletes from Shaanxi
1990 births
Living people
Universiade silver medalists for China
Medalists at the 2013 Summer Universiade
Medalists at the 2015 Summer Universiade